Jan Karaś (born 17 March 1959) is a former Polish footballer. During his club career he played for Hutnik Kraków, Legia Warsaw, Larissa, Kajaanin Palloilijat, Polonia Warsaw, and Dolcan Ząbki. He earned 16 caps for the Poland national football team and participated in the 1986 FIFA World Cup, where Poland reached the second round.

References

External links
 

1959 births
Living people
Polish footballers
Poland international footballers
1986 FIFA World Cup players
Legia Warsaw players
Polonia Warsaw players
Athlitiki Enosi Larissa F.C. players
Hutnik Nowa Huta players
Footballers from Kraków
Polonia Warsaw managers
Hutnik Warsaw players
Association football forwards
Polish football managers
Polish expatriate footballers
Expatriate footballers in Greece
Polish expatriate sportspeople in Greece